"Nacho" is the third episode of the first season of the AMC television series Better Call Saul, the spinoff series of Breaking Bad.  The episode aired on February 16, 2015, on AMC in the United States. Outside of the United States, the episode premiered on streaming service Netflix in several countries.

Plot

Opening
In a flashback to 1992, Chuck McGill meets Jimmy McGill in the Cook County Jail, where Jimmy is incarcerated for an offense that could result in him having to register as a sex offender. Jimmy pleads with Chuck to help get the charges dismissed. Chuck agrees to represent Jimmy on the condition that he stop running cons and find legitimate employment.

Main story
In the present, Jimmy is anxious about Nacho Varga's plot to steal from the Kettlemans. He calls Kim Wexler, a friend at HHM, who represent the Kettlemans. Jimmy indirectly warns Kim about the potential danger but then breaks off the call, insisting he is "no hero". Later that night, Jimmy calls the Kettlemans anonymously and warns them. The Kettlemans look outside and see somebody surveilling them from a parked van.

The next morning, Kim tells Jimmy that something has happened to the Kettlemans. He rushes to their house to find it surrounded by police, and finds out the entire Kettleman family is missing. Believing Nacho has kidnapped them, Jimmy tries unsuccessfully to reach him by phone. Jimmy is picked up by the police, who tell him they have arrested Nacho and that he has requested Jimmy as his lawyer.

At the police station, Nacho admits to Jimmy that he surveilled the Kettlemans but denies kidnapping them. Nacho warns Jimmy that if he does not get the charges dropped, Nacho will have him killed. Jimmy is unsuccessful at persuading the police to release Nacho but convinces Kim to take him to the Kettleman house so he can investigate. Jimmy notices some inconsistencies, such as a missing child's doll, and theorizes that the Kettlemans staged their kidnapping. Jimmy tells Kim he warned the Kettlemans about Nacho, which probably drove them into hiding.

At the courthouse, Jimmy starts a fight with Mike Ehrmantraut, who subdues him. The police ask Mike to press assault charges so they can leverage Jimmy to testify against Nacho but Mike refuses. He suggests to Jimmy that Jimmy's theory about the Kettlemans' disappearance is correct. Mike then recounts a similar case he investigated as a Philadelphia police officer and tells Jimmy the Kettlemans are probably hiding somewhere close to home. With the new lead, Jimmy explores the desert near the Kettleman house and finds their campsite. He confronts the Kettlemans, gets into a struggle with them, and inadvertently discovers their stolen money.

Production 
The episode was written by co-executive producer Thomas Schnauz, who was also a writer and producer on Breaking Bad. It was directed by Terry McDonough, who directed episodes for Breaking Bad, including the episode that introduced Saul Goodman.

Reception 
Upon airing, the episode received 3.23 million American viewers, and an 18-49 rating of 1.6.

The episode received positive reviews from critics. Erik Kain of Forbes said that "Overall, this was yet another strong entry in the show. Great shots of New Mexico, plenty of humor, and a little bit of mystery all kept this one humming from start to finish."

Michael Hogan of The Telegraph gave the episode 4 out of 5 stars, concluding:

Roth Cornet of IGN gave the episode 8.5 out of 10, saying "Better Call Saul continues to settle into itself, as Jimmy McGill's will to do the right thing is tested."" Richard Vine of The Guardian also gave a positive review, and was pleased that the episode began to examine Jimmy's relationships with Chuck and Kim, who "you really get the sense that she's fond of him, against her better judgement".

The episode earned a 100% "fresh" rating on Rotten Tomatoes, out of 20 reviews.

Notes

References

External links 
 "Nacho" at AMC
 

Better Call Saul (season 1) episodes